Alfredas Skroblas (born 11 March 1984) is a Lithuanian professional football player who plays for UMF Snaefell in Iceland. As of 10 March 2017, he is serving a 12-month ban imposed by the Lithuanian Football Federation for match-fixing.

References

External links
 
 Alfredas Skroblas at playmakerstats.com (English version of ogol.com.br)

1984 births
Living people
Sportspeople from Marijampolė
Lithuanian footballers
Lithuania international footballers
FK Ekranas players
FK Sūduva Marijampolė players
FK Šilas players
A Lyga players
Association football defenders
Þróttur Vogum players